This is the list of presidents of Lazio since 1970.

; Presidents elected by the Regional Council (1970–1995)

 Directly-elected presidents (since 1995)

 
Politics of Lazio
Lazio